Corymbia polycarpa, also known as the long-fruited bloodwood or small-flowered bloodwood, is a species of tree that is endemic to northern Australia. Indigenous Australians of different language groups have different names for the tree. The Nungali peoples know the tree as narrga or gunjid, the Mulluk-Mulluk know it as dawart, the Yangman know it as bodog, the Gurindji peoples as jadburru and the Wagiman as jagatjjin. It is a medium-sized tree with rough, tessellated bark on the trunk and branches, lance-shaped to curved adult leaves, flower buds in groups of seven or nine, white or cream-coloured flowers and barrel-shaped fruit.

Description
It has rough, tessellated, flaky and brownish bark on the trunk and branches. Older bark is grey brown and newer bark is red-brown in colour. The buds have a whitish scaly surface due to the fragmenting rubber cuticle. Flowering occurs from April to August and the flowers are white or cream-coloured.

This species is distinguished from C. clarksoniana. C. ligans and C. novoguinensis in the basis of fruit shape.

Taxonomy
The species was first formally described as Eucalyptus polycarpa by the botanist Ferdinand von Mueller in 1859 in the Journal of the Proceedings of the Linnean Society, Botany. It was reclassified into the genus Corymbia in 1995 by Ken Hill and Lawrence Alexander Sidney Johnson in the journal Telopea.

Distribution
Corymbia polycarpa is found in Western Australia, the Northern Territory, Queensland and northwestern New South Wales. The species is quite common between Broome and Derby in Western Australia through the Kimberley region of Western Australia extending east over the Top End of the Northern Territory including nearby islands and across the Gulf of Carpentaria and southern Cape York Peninsula in Queensland. It is found near watercourses, in depressions or on floodplains growing in sandy or silty alluvium and less commonly in cracking clays and in skeletal sandstone or lateritic soils.

Uses
The timber from the tree is a very durable, with an above-ground life expectancy in excess of 40 years which drops to 25 years when used in-ground. The timber is vulnerable to termite attack and untreated sapwood is prone to damage by lyctine borers. It is a hardwood and difficult to work with hand tools. It is mostly used as round timber rather than sawn timber as a result of the numerous kino veins. It has been used as poles, railway sleepers, mining supports, for fencing and house stumps. Indigenous Australians used the gum medicinally as an antiseptic liquid to treat cuts, sores, burns, ulcers and yaws.

See also
 List of Corymbia species

Gallery

References

polycarpa
Myrtales of Australia
Flora of Queensland
Rosids of Western Australia
Flora of the Northern Territory
Plants described in 1995
Taxa named by Ferdinand von Mueller